Frank Jackson may refer to:

Politics
 Frank D. Jackson (1854–1938), governor of Iowa 1894–1896
 Frank Jackson (Alabama politician) (1915–1983), Alabama politician
 Frank G. Jackson (born 1946), mayor of Cleveland, Ohio
 John Jackson (South East Derbyshire MP) (Frank John Jackson, 1919–1976), British Conservative Member of Parliament, 1959–1964

Sports
 Frank Jackson (American football) (born 1939), pro wide receiver
 Frank Jackson (basketball) (born 1998), NBA player

Other
 Frank Jackson (outlaw) (1856–?), cowboy and outlaw
 F. H. Jackson (1870–1960), English clergyman and mathematician
 Frank Cameron Jackson (born 1943), professor of philosophy at Australian National University
 Frank E. Jackson Jr. (born 1965), film director, producer, and writer
 An alias used by Ramón Mercader (1913–1978), assassin of Leon Trotsky

See also
Francis Jackson (disambiguation)